The Apple Museum was a museum located in Prague, exploring the history of products designed by Apple Inc. The exhibition was closed in September 2020 during the COVID-19 pandemic, and never reopened. There are differing accounts as to the fate of the collection, with some saying it was a heist or that it remains in dispute between individuals involved with operating the museum.

In 2017, the admission price to the museum was €9 per adult.

See also 
 List of museums in Prague

References

External links

 

Museums in Prague
History of Apple Inc.
2015 establishments in the Czech Republic
2020 disestablishments in the Czech Republic
Museums established in 2015
Museums disestablished in 2020
21st-century architecture in the Czech Republic